John Stevens Cogdell was an American sculptor who lived in Charleston, South Carolina, in the first half of the nineteenth century. He was also a lawyer and public official, and was a member of the city's St. Cecilia Society. He served as Comptroller General of South Carolina. In 1827, he was elected into the National Academy of Design as an Honorary Academician.

References
Anna Wells Rutledge, "Cogdell and Mills, Charleston Sculptors", Antiques 41 (1942): 192–193.

External links
 Genealogy and other information on Cogdell
 http://www.cr.nps.gov/nr/travel/charleston/sma.htm
  The Winterthur Library Overview of an archival collection on John S. Cogdell.
 

American sculptors
Comptrollers General of South Carolina
People from Charleston, South Carolina